Service with a Smile is a 1934 Vitaphone short comedy film released by Warner Bros. on July 28, 1934 that was the first live-action film in full color (three-strip Technicolor). This film debuted in theaters a few weeks before the Pioneer Pictures film La Cucaracha (also produced in three-strip Technicolor).

Premise
Leon shows off his new "deluxe" service station, complete with golf course, food service, and a staff of "chorus girls" pumping gas.

External links
Service with a Smile at IMDB

1934 films
Warner Bros. films
Films directed by Roy Mack
American comedy short films
1934 comedy films
1930s American films